67 Squadron or 67th Squadron may refer to:

 No. 67 Squadron RAAF, a unit of the Royal Australian Air Force 
 No. 67 Squadron RAF, a unit of the United Kingdom Royal Air Force 
 67th Special Operations Squadron, a unit of the United States Air Force 
 67th Fighter Squadron, a unit of the United States Air Force

See also
 67th Division (disambiguation)
 67th Regiment (disambiguation)